Caryothraustes is a genus of grosbeak in the family Cardinalidae.

The genus was introduced by the German naturalist Ludwig Reichenbach in 1850. The type species was subsequently designated as the yellow-green grosbeak. The name Caryothraustes combines the Ancient Greek words karuon "nut" and  thraustēs "breaker".

The genus contains two species:

References

 
Bird genera
Taxonomy articles created by Polbot
Taxa named by Ludwig Reichenbach